Incolacris is the type genus of grasshoppers in the subfamily Incolacridinae (previously the tribe Incolacridini Tinkham, 1940).  To date, species have been recorded from China, the Philippines and Peninsular Malaysia.

Four species of Incolacris have been also placed in the subfamily Catantopinae and genus Stolzia, but the original name was revived in 2021 as part of a review of tribe Incolacridini.

Species
The Orthoptera Species File lists:
 Incolacris flavomaculata Willemse, 1939
 Incolacris hainanensis Tinkham, 1940
 Incolacris jianfengensis (Zheng & Ma, 1989)
 Incolacris rubritarsi Willemse, 1932 - type species - locality Siargao, Philippines
 Incolacris trifasciata Willemse, 1932

References

External links

Acrididae genera
Orthoptera of Malesia